Jean-Louis Hardouin Michelin de Choisy  (25 May 1786 – 9 July 1867, in Versailles) was a French malacologist and palaeontologist.

Michelin de Choisy  was an 'Inspecteur des Finances'. He wrote Description des polypiers fossiles du Bassin Parisien. (Groupe Supracrétacé.) Avec figures lithographiées par Ludovic Michelin in  Iconographie zoophytologique and many papers in Magasin de conchyliologie.

References
H. Crosse & P. Fischer, 1868. Nécrologie.Journal de Conchyliologie 16(1): 121.
L. Germain & G. Ranson, 1937. Notice sur H. Michelin et ses collections. Bulletin du Muséum National d’Histoire Naturelle (ser. 2) 9(6): 387-390.

External links
BHL Iconographie zoophytologique

French malacologists
French paleontologists
1786 births
1867 deaths